This is a complete list of National Register of Historic Places listings in Ramsey County, Minnesota. It is intended to be a complete list of the properties and districts on the National Register of Historic Places in Ramsey County, Minnesota, United States.  The locations of National Register properties and districts for which the latitude and longitude coordinates are included below, may be seen in an online map.

There are 126 properties in the county listed on the National Register of Historic Places including three National Historic Landmarks. A supplementary list includes five additional sites that were formerly listed on the National Register.

History

Ramsey County is a county located in the southeastern part of the U.S. state of Minnesota, bounded in some places by the Mississippi River, by Hennepin County, Anoka County, Washington County, and Dakota County. All of the county seat, Saint Paul, is in the county, including Saint Paul's "West Side" neighborhood, which is south of the Mississippi River.

The county's historic places include houses, places of worship, commerce, and education, and community centers and infrastructure. Several districts encompass several structures of related historic significance. Some of the oldest structures in the state are in Ramsey County, representing the earliest of non-indigenous residents in the state. As the northernmost natural port on the Upper Mississippi River, Saint Paul grew, handling both river and rail freight and passenger traffic. Even as Minneapolis (in Hennepin County) eventually surpassed Saint Paul in the volume of commerce, Saint Paul remained relevant as the state capital and associated government services and employment kept the county growing. Several of the sites are specifically related to the various first-generation immigrant populations that made Ramsey County their new home in the United States, especially Germans, Czechs, Scandinavians, and Austro-Hungarians, which together comprised the majority of residents in the first century of the county's history.

Current listings

|}

Former listings

|}

See also
 List of National Historic Landmarks in Minnesota
 National Register of Historic Places listings in Minnesota

References

External links

 Minnesota National Register Properties Database —Minnesota Historical Society

Ramsey